The P.C. Blues is an album by pianist Red Garland featuring tracks recorded in 1957 at the sessions that produced Red Garland's Piano and Groovy (with one track from Miles Davis' 1956 album Workin' with The Miles Davis Quintet added) which were first released on the Prestige label until 1970.

Reception

In his review for Allmusic, Scott Yanow called it a "thoughtful but swinging release".

Track listing
 "Ahmad's Blues" (Ahmad Jamal) - 7:29   
 "Lost April" (Eddie DeLange, Emil Newman, Hubert Spencer) - 6:26   
 "Why Was I Born?" (Oscar Hammerstein II, Jerome Kern) - 5:49   
 "Tweedle Dee Dee" (Winfield Scott) - 13:18   
 "The P.C. Blues" (Red Garland) - 9:53  
Recorded at Van Gelder Studio on May 11, 1956 (track 1), March 22, 1957 (track 3) and August 9, 1957 (tracks 2, 4 & 5)

Personnel
Red Garland - piano
Paul Chambers - bass 
Philly Joe Jones (track 1) Art Taylor (tracks 2-5) - drums

References 

Prestige Records albums
Red Garland albums
1970 albums
Albums recorded at Van Gelder Studio
Albums produced by Bob Weinstock